During the 1993–94 English football season, Nottingham Forest F.C. competed in the Football League First Division.

Season summary
Frank Clark, who had been a left-back in Nottingham Forest's 1979 European Cup winning team, returned to the club in May 1993 to succeed Brian Clough as manager. Clough had been at the club for 18 years and won seven major trophies in that time, but had left on a low note as Forest were relegated from the Premier League. Having inherited most of the players from the Clough era, Clark was able to achieve an instant return to the Premiership when the club finished Division One runners-up at the end of the 1993–94 season. He also added notable new players to the squad in the shape of Southend United striker Stan Collymore and Norwich City and Wales winger David Phillips, along with defender Colin Cooper from Millwall.

Final league table

Results
Nottingham Forest's score comes first

Legend

Football League First Division

FA Cup

League Cup

Anglo-Italian Cup

Squad

References

Nottingham Forest F.C. seasons
Nottingham Forest